Escadron de Chasse 3/3 Ardennes (Fighter Squadron 3/3 Ardennes) is a French Air and Space Force (Armée de l'air et de l'espace) fighter squadron currently stationed at BA 133 Nancy – Ochey Air Base which flies the Dassault Mirage 2000D.

See also

 List of French Air and Space Force aircraft squadrons

References

Fighter squadrons of the French Air and Space Force